Events from the year 1568 in Ireland.

Incumbent
Monarch: Elizabeth I

Events
First Desmond rebellion starts (lasts until 1572).

Births
Henry Piers, landowner and politician (d. 1623)

Deaths

References

 
1560s in Ireland
Ireland
Years of the 16th century in Ireland